Chamisso Island is a small island in Kotzebue Sound, Alaska. It is located off Spafarief Bay at the mouth of Eschscholtz Bay, just south of the Choris Peninsula.

The island is roughly triangular.

Chamisso Island has been a Natural Reserve since December 7, 1912. The protected area, the Chamisso Wilderness, includes Chamisso Island and nearby Puffin Island, as well as some rocky islets nearby. Both islands are part of the Chukchi Sea unit of the Alaska Maritime National Wildlife Refuge.

This island was named after naturalist Adelbert von Chamisso, who reached the island in 1816.

See also 
 List of islands of Alaska

References

External links
 Map

Islands of the Chukchi Sea
Islands of Northwest Arctic Borough, Alaska
Alaska Maritime National Wildlife Refuge
Adelbert von Chamisso
Islands of Alaska